The Northern and Southern dynasties was a period of political division in the history of China that lasted from 420 to 589, following the tumultuous era of the Sixteen Kingdoms and the Eastern Jin dynasty. It is sometimes considered as the latter part of a longer period known as the Six Dynasties (220–589). Albeit an age of civil war and political chaos, it was also a time of flourishing arts and culture, advancement in technology, and the spread of Mahayana Buddhism and Daoism. The period saw large-scale migration of the Han people to the lands south of the Yangtze. The period came to an end with the unification of all of China proper by Emperor Wen of the Sui dynasty.

During this period, the process of sinicization accelerated among the non-Han ethnicities in the north and among the indigenous peoples in the south. This process was also accompanied by the increasing popularity of Buddhism (introduced into China in the 1st century) in both northern and southern China and Daoism gaining influence as well, with two essential Daoist canons written during this period.

Notable technological advances occurred during this period. The invention of the stirrup during the earlier Jin dynasty (266–420) helped spur the development of heavy cavalry as a combat standard. Historians also note advances in medicine, astronomy, mathematics, and cartography. Intellectuals of the period include the mathematician and astronomer Zu Chongzhi (429–500), and astronomer Tao Hongjing.

Background

After the collapse of a unified China proper under the Eastern Han dynasty in 220 due in large part to the Yellow Turban and the Five Pecks of Rice rebellions, China eventually coalesced into the Three Kingdoms. Of these, Cao Wei was the strongest, followed by Eastern Wu and Shu Han, but they were initially in a relatively stable formation. After a 249 coup by Sima Yi, the Sima family essentially controlled Cao Wei and the conquest of Shu Han by Cao Wei rapidly followed.

Following a failed coup by the ruling Cao family against the Sima family, the final Cao ruler abdicated. Sima Yan (Emperor Wu of Jin) then founded the Western Jin dynasty and the conquest of Eastern Wu by Western Jin occurred in 280, ending the Three Kingdoms period and reuniting China proper.

The Western Jin dynasty was severely weakened after the War of the Eight Princes from 291 to 306. During the reigns of Emperor Huai of Jin and Emperor Min of Jin, the empire was put into grave danger with the uprising of northern non-Han peoples collectively known as the Five Barbarians, when numerous nomadic tribal groups resettled in northern and northwestern China who had been heavily drafted into the military then exploited the civil wars to seize power. Their armies almost destroyed the dynasty in the Disaster of Yongjia of 311, when the Five Barbarians sacked Luoyang. Chang'an met a similar fate in 316.

However, a scion of the imperial house, Sima Rui (Emperor Yuan of Jin) fled south of the Huai River and reestablished the dynasty, known in historiography as the Eastern Jin dynasty. Cementing their power in the south, the Eastern Jin established Jiankang on the existing site of Jianye (now Nanjing) as their new capital.

In the north, the Five Barbarians established numerous short-lived dynasties, leading to the period known as the Sixteen Kingdoms in historiography. Eventually, the Northern Wei dynasty conquered the rest of the northern states in 439 and unified northern China. Although the Eastern Jin and successive southern dynasties were well-defended from the northern dynasties by their placement of naval fleets along the Yangtze, there were still various problems related to the creation and maintenance of military strength. The designation of specific households for military service in the tuntian system eventually led to a falling out in their social status, causing widespread desertion of troops on many occasions. Faced with shortage of troop numbers, Eastern Jin generals were often sent on campaigns to capture non-Han peoples in the south to draft them into the military. The Eastern Jin dynasty fell not because of external invasion, however, but because Liu Yu (Emperor Wu of Liu Song) seized the throne from the Emperor Gong of Jin and founded the Liu Song dynasty, which officially began the Northern and Southern dynasties period.

Northern dynasties

The Northern dynasties began in 439 when the Northern Wei conquered the Northern Liang to unite northern China and ended in 589 when the Sui dynasty extinguished the Chen dynasty. It can be divided into three time periods: Northern Wei; Eastern and Western Weis; Northern Qi and Northern Zhou. The Northern, Eastern, and Western Wei along with the Northern Zhou were established by the Xianbei people while the Northern Qi was established by a Xianbei-influenced ethnic Han.

In the north, local ethnic Han gentry clans had consolidated themselves by constructing fortified villages. A clan would carve out a de facto fief through a highly cohesive family-based self-defense community. Lesser peasant families would work for the dominant clan as tenants or serfs. This was a response to the chaotic political environment, and these Han gentry families largely avoided government service before the Northern Wei court launched the sinicization movement. The northern gentry was therefore highly militarized as compared to the refined southern aristocrats, and this distinction persisted well into the Sui and Tang dynasties centuries later.

Northern Wei (386–535)

Rise to power

In the Sixteen Kingdoms period, the Tuoba family of the Xianbei were the rulers of the state of Dai (Sixteen Kingdoms). Although it was conquered by the Former Qin, the defeat of the Former Qin at the Battle of Fei River resulted in the collapse of the Former Qin. The grandson of the last prince of Dai Tuoba Shiyijian, Tuoba Gui restored the fortunes of the Tuoba clan, renaming his state Wei (now known as Northern Wei) with its capital at Shengle (near modern Hohhot).  Under the rule of Emperors Daowu (Tuoba Gui), Mingyuan, and Taiwu, the Northern Wei progressively expanded. The establishment of the early Northern Wei state and the economy were also greatly indebted to the father-son pair of Cui Hong and Cui Hao. Tuoba Gui engaged in numerous conflicts with the Later Yan that ended favorably for the Northern Wei after they received help from Zhang Gun that allowed them to destroy the Later Yan army at the Battle of Canhe Slope. Following this victory, Tuoba Gui conquered the Later Yan capital of Pingcheng (modern-day Datong). That same year he declared himself Emperor Daowu.

Due to Emperor Daowu's cruelty, he was killed by his son Tuoba Shao, but crown prince Tuoba Si managed to defeat Tuoba Shao and took the throne as Emperor Mingyuan. Though he managed to conquer Liu Song's province of Henan, he died soon afterward. Emperor Mingyuan's son Tuoba Tao took the throne as Emperor Taiwu. Due to Emperor Taiwu's energetic efforts, Northern Wei's strength greatly increased, allowing them to repeatedly attack Liu Song. After dealing with the Rouran threat to his northern flank, he engaged in a war to unite northern China. With the fall of the Northern Liang in 439, Emperor Taiwu united northern China, ending the Sixteen Kingdoms period and beginning the Northern and Southern dynasties period with their southern rivals, the Liu Song.

Even though it was a time of great military strength for the Northern Wei, because of Rouran harassment in the north, they could not fully focus on their southern expeditions. After uniting the north, Emperor Taiwu also conquered the powerful Shanshan kingdom and subjugated the other kingdoms of Xiyu, or the Western Regions. In 450, Emperor Taiwu once again attacked the Liu Song and reached Guabu (瓜步, in modern Nanjing, Jiangsu), threatening to cross the river to attack Jiankang, the Liu Song capital. Though up to this point, the Northern Wei military forces dominated the Liu Song forces, they took heavy casualties. The Northern Wei forces plundered numerous households before returning north.

At this point, followers of the Buddhist Gai Wu (蓋吳) rebelled. After pacifying this rebellion, Emperor Taiwu, under the advice of his Daoist prime minister Cui Hao, proscribed Buddhism, in the first of the Three Disasters of Wu. At this late stage in his life, Emperor Taiwu meted out cruel punishments, which led to his death in 452 at the hands of the eunuch Zong Ai. This sparked off turmoil that only ended with the ascension of Emperor Wencheng later that same year.

In the first half of the Northern Wei dynasty, the Xianbei steppe tribesmen who dominated northern China kept a policy of strict social distinction between them and their Han subjects. Ethnic Han were drafted into the bureaucracy, employed as officials to collect taxes, etc. However, the Han were kept out of many higher positions of power. They also represented the minority of the populace where centers of power were located.

In 446 an ethnic Qiang rebellion was crushed by the Northern Wei. Wang Yu (王遇) was an ethnic Qiang eunuch and he may have been castrated during the rebellion since the Northern Wei would castrate the rebel tribe's young elite. according to the Weishu Wang Yu was born in Lirun, Fengyi (modern day Chengcheng). Wang Yu patronized Buddhism and in 488 had a temple constructed in his birth place.

Sinicization
Widespread social and cultural transformation in northern China came with Emperor Xiaowen of Northern Wei (reigned 471–499), whose father was a Xianbei, but whose mother was Han. Although of the Tuoba Clan from the Xianbei tribe, Emperor Xiaowen asserted his dual Xianbei-Han identity, renaming his own clan Yuan (元 meaning "elemental" or  "origin"). In the year 493 Emperor Xiaowen instituted a new sinification program that had the Xianbei elites conform to many Han standards. These social reforms included donning Han clothing (banning Xianbei clothing at court), learning the Han language (if under the age of thirty), converting Xianbei family names to one-character Han surnames, and encouraging high-ranking Xianbei and Han families to intermarry. Emperor Xiaowen also moved the capital city from Pingcheng to one of China's old imperial sites, Luoyang, which had been the capital during the earlier Eastern Han and Western Jin dynasties. The new capital at Luoyang was revived and transformed, with roughly 150,000 Xianbei and other northern warriors moved from north to south to fill new ranks for the capital by the year 495. Within a couple of decades, the population rose to about half a million residents and was famed for being home to over a thousand Buddhist temples. Defectors from the south, such as Wang Su of the prestigious Langye Wang family, were largely accommodated and felt at home with the establishment of their own Wu quarter in Luoyang (this quarter of the city was home to over three thousand families). They were even served tea (by this time gaining popularity in southern China) at court instead of yogurt drinks commonly found in the north.

In the year 523, Prince Dongyang of the Northern Wei was sent to Dunhuang to serve as its governor for a term of fifteen years. With the Buddhism gaining mainstream acceptance in Chinese society, Prince Dongyang and local wealthy families set out to establish a monumental project in honor of Buddhism, carving and decorating Cave 285 of the Mogao Caves with beautiful statues and murals. This promotion of the arts would continue for centuries at Dunhuang and is now one of China's greatest tourist attractions.

The Northern Wei started to arrange for Han elites to marry daughters of the Xianbei Tuoba imperial family in the 480s. More than fifty percent of Tuoba Xianbei princesses of the Northern Wei were married to southern Han men from the imperial families and aristocrats of the Southern dynasties who defected and moved north to join the Northern Wei. Several daughters of the Xianbei Emperor Xiaowen of Northern Wei married Han elites: the Liu Song royal Liu Hui (刘辉), married Princess Lanling (蘭陵公主) of the Northern Wei, Princess Huayang (華陽公主) to Sima Fei (司馬朏), a descendant of Jin royalty, Princess Jinan (濟南公主) to Lu Daoqian (盧道虔), Princess Nanyang (南阳长公主) to Xiao Baoyin (萧宝夤), a member of Southern Qi royalty. Emperor Xiaozhuang of Northern Wei's sister the Shouyang Princess was wedded to Emperor Wu of Liang's son Xiao Zong 蕭綜. According to the Book of Zhou, Emperor Xiaowu of Northern Wei's sister was married to the ethnic Han Zhang Huan, son of Zhang Qiong. When the Eastern Jin dynasty ended, Northern Wei received the Jin prince Sima Chuzhi (司馬楚之) as a refugee, and he married a Northern Wei Princess. Their son Sima Jinlong (司馬金龍) in turn married Northern Liang Xiongnu King Juqu Mujian's daughter.

Split into Eastern Wei (534–550) and Western Wei (535–557)

In that same year of 523 a revolt of several military garrisons, the Rebellion of the Six Garrisons (Liu Zhen) was caused by a food shortage far north of Luoyang. After this was suppressed, the government had 200,000 surrendered garrison rebels deployed to Hebei, which proved later to be a mistake when a former garrison officer organized another rebellion in the years 526–527. The cause of these wars was the growing rift between the governing aristocracy which was increasingly adopting Han-style sedentary policies and lifestyles and their nomadic tribal armies who continued to preserve the old steppe way of life.

The Northern Wei court was betrayed by one of their own generals, who had the empress dowager and the young emperor thrown into the Yellow River while establishing his own puppet ruler to maintain authority. As conflict swelled in the north between successive leaders, Gao Huan took control of the east and Luoyang (holding Emperor Xiaojing of Eastern Wei as a puppet ruler) by 534, while his rival Yuwen Tai took control of the west and the traditional Chinese capital of Chang'an by 535. The Western regime was dominated by the sinicized nobles and their Han bureaucrats while the Eastern regime was controlled by the traditional steppe tribes.

Northern Qi (550–577) and Northern Zhou (557–581)

Eventually, Gao Huan's son Gao Yang forced the Eastern Wei emperor to abdicate in favor of his claim to the throne, establishing the Northern Qi dynasty (551–577). Afterward, Yuwen Tai's son Yuwen Jue seized the throne of power from Emperor Gong of Western Wei, establishing the Northern Zhou dynasty (557–580). Like its predecessor the Western Wei, the Northern Zhou reacted against sinicization by trying to revive Xianbei warrior culture: reviving Xianbei tunics, trousers and boots, reversing the sinicized surnames into Xianbei names and even giving Han officers Xianbei surnames. This "tribalization" policy was intended to convert large numbers of Han Chinese army recruits into "Xianbei" who would pay for their own equipment in exchange for tax exemptions, and was highly successful in boosting the state's military strength.

The Northern Zhou dynasty was able to defeat and conquer Northern Qi in 577, reunifying the north. However, this success was short-lived, as the Northern Zhou was overthrown in 581 by Yang Jian, who became Emperor Wen of Sui.

With greater military power and morale, along with convincing propaganda that the Chen dynasty ruler Chen Shubao was a decadent ruler who had lost the Mandate of Heaven, the Sui Dynasty was able to effectively conquer the south. After this conquest, the whole of China entered a new golden age of reunification under the centralization of the short-lived Sui dynasty and the succeeding Tang dynasty (618–907).

The core elite of the Northern dynasties, mixed-culture, and mixed-ethnicity military clans, would later also form the founding elites of the Sui and Tang dynasties. Hence, they tended to have a flexible approach to steppe nomads, viewing them as possible partners rather than intrinsic enemies.

Southern dynasties

The Jin were succeeded by a series of short-lived dynasties: Liu Song (420–479), Southern Qi (479–502), Liang (502–557) and Chen (557–589). Because all of these dynasties had their capital at Jiankang except Liang, they are sometimes grouped together with Eastern Wu and Eastern Jin as the Six Dynasties. The rulers of these short-lived dynasties were generals who seized and then held power for several decades but were unable to securely pass power of rule onto their heirs to continue their dynasty successfully. Emperor Wu of Liang (502–549) was the most notable ruler of his age, being a patron of the arts and of Buddhism.

The Southern dynasties, except for the last Chen dynasty, were strongly dominated by the shijia, the great families, who monopolised political power until the mid-6th century. This class was created by Cao Cao during the late Han dynasty when he attempted to consolidate his power by building an endogamous military caste of professional soldiers. This led to the rise and usurpation of the Sima family who ruled the Jin dynasty, and subsequent leaders were similarly unable to bring the other great families in line. When the Jin dynasty fled south, the weakness of the central government was greatly exacerbated, and the great families who accompanied the Emperor in his flight, along with the most wealthy clans of earlier settlers along the Zhejiang coast, were the primary power of the Eastern Jin. With the greatly increased importance of proving one's pedigree to receive privileges, there was a rise in compiling of genealogy records, and the great families moved to legally outlaw intermarriage with common families. The lower class Northern migrants were forced to become "guests" (dependents) of the great families who established private guard forces. When the Eastern Jin attempted to draft the dependents of the great families, they were quickly overthrown.

However, with the fall of the Eastern Jin in 420, the balance of power shifted in favour the central government. The subsequent Liu Song, Qi, Liang and Chen dynasties were ruled by military leaders from low social status backgrounds. They gradually stripped the powerful clans of military power, authority and wealth. They stationed regional armies around the country under the command of the imperial relatives, and recruited officers from humble backgrounds. They appointed low-level officials to monitor the powerful elites in the top government posts. The southern aristocracy declined with the rise of the Indian Ocean trade in the mid 5th century, which led to the court revenues shifting to trade and the disappearance of the caste by the Chen dynasty. As landowning aristocrats were unable to convert cash from the produce of their estates, the resurgence of trade and the money-based economy forced them to break up and sell their lands to the burgeoning merchant class. Influential merchants increasingly occupied political offices, displacing the old aristocrats. On the other hand, the economic developments also drove peasants, unable to cope with inflation or to pay taxes in cash, to become mercenary soldiers, wandering through the country selling their services to the warring princes and plundering the populace. These upheavals devastated the south which eased the fall of the south to the Sui dynasty.

Under the later waning leadership of the Chen dynasty, the southern Chinese were unable to resist the military power amassed in the north by Yang Jian, who declared himself Emperor Wen of Sui and invaded the south.

Aboriginal chiefs played an important active role in adapting to the dominant Chinese structure, rather than being forcibly subjugated. For instance, the aboriginal chief Lady Xian who married the Liang court's governor Feng Bao, helped to extend the dynasties' authority while preserving autonomy and local culture. Lady Xian and Feng Bao played a critical role in assisting Chen Baxian's rise, and in stabilising the region between the Liang, Chen, and Sui dynasties. The court acknowledged such authority by awarding her with official titles and emblems of power. There were many other local chieftains of mixed origins between Guangzhou and modern Vietnam that displayed mixed traits of both aboriginal and sinicized culture, such as the Ning of Qinzhou, the Li of Guizhou-Tengzhou and the Chen of Shuangzhou. These families functioned both as cheftains to the natives and bureaucrats to the court.

Liu Song (420–479)

Liu Song founder Liu Yu was originally a leader of the Army of the Northern Garrison that notably won the Battle of Fei River in 383. In 404, he helped suppress Huan Xuan's rebellion, leading to his dominance over the Eastern Jin court. In order to gain popularity to take the throne he led expeditions against the Sixteen Kingdoms, capturing Shandong, Henan and, briefly, Guanzhong by 416. He gave up Guanzhong to try to take the throne. Because he believed in a prophecy saying there would be one more emperor after Emperor An, he deposed the former and, soon afterwards, his replacement, Emperor Gong in 420, ending the Eastern Jin dynasty.

Even after crowning himself Emperor Wu, Liu Yu remained frugal. However, he did not care for education and trusted unsavory people. He felt that the nobility had too much power, so he tended to appoint the lower classes to government positions and gave military power to imperial kinsmen. Ironically, because the imperial kinsmen stabilized their military power and wished to gain political power, Emperor Wu was afraid they would have thoughts of usurping the throne. Thus, he also frequently killed his kinsmen.

After the death of Emperor Wu, his son Emperor Shao ruled briefly before being judged incompetent and killed by government officials led by Xu Xianzhi, replacing him with Emperor Wen, a different son, who soon killed the officials who supported him. Emperor Wen's reign was a period of relative political stability because of his frugality and good government; the period was called the Reign of Yuanjia.

In 430, Emperor Wen started a number of northern expeditions against Northern Wei. These were ineffective because of insufficient preparations and excessive micromanagement of his generals, increasingly weakening the dynasty. Because of his jealousy of Tan Daoji, a noted leader of the Army of the Northern Garrison, he deprived himself of a formidable general to the great delight of the Northern Wei. Thus, they were unable to capitalize when Northern Wei suffered the Wuqi Incident. Starting in 445, Northern Wei, taking advantage of Liu Song's weakness, made major incursions in the lands between the Yangtze and the Huai (modern Shandong, Hebei, and Henan) and devastating six provinces. Emperor Wen lamented that if Tan were still alive, he would have prevented Northern Wei advances. From then on, Liu Song was in a weakened state.

Emperor Wen was assassinated by Crown Prince Shao and Second Prince Jun in 453 after planning to punish them for witchcraft. However, they were both defeated by Third Prince Jun, who become Emperor Xiaowu.  proved to be licentious and cruel, supposedly committing incest with the daughters of an uncle who had helped him gain the throne; his rivals also claimed he had incest with his mother. This led to two rebellions by the imperial clan, one of which saw him slaughter the inhabitants of Guangling. The following ballad gives an idea of those times:
  Looking toward Jiankang city
  the little river flows against the current
  in front, one sees sons killing fathers
  and behind, one sees younger brothers killing older brothers 

Emperor Xiaowu died naturally in 464 and was succeeded by his son, who became Emperor Qianfei. Emperor Qianfei proved to be similar to his father, engaging in both kin-slaughter and incest. In a scandalous move, because his sister complained about how it was unfair that men were allowed 10,000 concubines, he gave her 30 handsome young men as lovers. His uncle Liu Yu, the Prince of Xiangdong, whom he called the "Prince of Pigs" for his obesity, eventually assassinated him and became Emperor Ming.

Emperor Ming began his reign by killing all the descendants of Emperor Xiaowu, and his suspicious nature resulted in the loss of the provinces north of the Huai River, which were only briefly regained in the other Southern dynasties. Emperor Ming's young son became Emperor Houfei. The political situation was volatile. General Xiao Daocheng slowly gained power and eventually deposed Emperor Houfei in favor of his brother, who became Emperor Shun. After defeating the rival general Shen Youzhi, Xiao forced Emperor Shun to yield to throne and crowned himself Emperor Gao of Southern Qi, thus ending the Liu Song dynasty.

Southern Qi (479–502)

Though distantly related, the Southern Qi and the following Liang dynasty were members of the Xiao (蕭) family from Lanling (蘭陵, in modern Cangshan County, Shandong). Because Emperor Gao had a low social standing, he earned the disdain of nobility. His style of governance was similar to the early style of the Liu Song dynasty and was very economical. He died in the fourth year of his reign and his heir, who was only 13 years younger than him, succeeded him as Emperor Wu of Southern Qi. Emperor Wu made peace with the Northern Wei, content to protect his borders. This period of peace was known as Yongming Administration (永明之治). He also used government secretaries (典簽官) appointed with provincial governors and members of the imperial clan to monitor them. 

The short reigns of Emperor Wu's grandsons, Xiao Zhaoye and Xiao Zhaowen (his first son predeceased him), were dominated by Xiao Luan, Emperor's Wu's first cousin. He killed them in turn and crowned himself as Emperor Ming of Southern Qi. Using the government secretaries, he slaughtered all the sons of Emperors Gao and Wu. Emperor Ming soon became very ill and started following Daoism, changing his whole wardrobe to red. He also passed an edict making officials try to find whitebait (銀魚). He died in 498 and was succeeded by his son Xiao Baojuan, who killed high officials and governors at whim, sparking many revolts. The final revolt in 501 started after Xiao Baojuan killed his prime minister Xiao Yi, leading his brother Xiao Yan to revolt under the banner of Xiao Baojuan's brother who was declared Emperor He of Southern Qi. Xiao Baojuan was killed by one of his generals during the siege of his capital at Jiankang, and after a short puppet reign by Emperor He, Xiao Yan overthrew the Southern Qi and established the Liang dynasty.

Liang (502–557)

Emperor Wu was economical, worked hard at governing, and cared for the common people. His early reign was known as Reign of Tianjian (天監之治). The Liang dynasty's military strength gradually surpassed the strength of the Northern Wei, who suffered internal strife due to their policy of sinicization. In 503, the Northern Wei invaded but were defeated at Zhongli (modern Bengbu). Emperor Wu supported the Northern Expeditions but did not aggressively take advantage of his victory in 516 at Shouyang due to heavy casualties. Given the excessive kin-slaughter in the Liu Song and Southern Qi dynasties, Emperor Wu was very lenient to imperial clansmen, not even investigating them when they committed crimes. The Liang reached a cultural peak because he was very learned, supported scholars, and encouraged the flourishing education system. An avid poet, Emperor Wu was fond of gathering many literary talents at court, and even held poetry competitions with prizes of gold or silk for those considered the best.

In his later years, however, sycophants surrounded him. Three times he dedicated his life (捨身) to Buddhism and tried to become a monk, but each time he was persuaded to return by extravagant court donations to Buddhism. Furthermore, since Buddhists and Daoists were exempt from taxation, nearly half of the population fraudulently named themselves as such, badly damaging state finances. Imperial clansmen and officials were also greedy and wasteful.

Emperor Wu was willing to accept generals who defected from Northern Wei.  So when Northern Wei suffered major revolts in their northern garrison towns, he sent his general Chen Qingzhi to support the pretender Yuan Hao. Despite the fact that Chen was only given 7,000 troops, he still managed to defeat army after army and even captured Luoyang, the capital of Northern Wei. Ultimately, Chen was insufficiently supplied and was defeated by troops ten times his size. After the Northern Wei split into Eastern and Western Wei, Emperor Wu granted asylum to rebel Eastern Wei commander Hou Jing, sending him on Northern Expeditions against Eastern Wei. After some initial successes, Liang forces were decisively defeated. Rumors abounded that Emperor Wu intended to give Hou as a peace offering. Despite Emperor Wu's assurances, Hou decided to rebel in the name of Xiao Dong, the grandson of the former crown prince Xiao Tong who died in 531 and was removed from crown prince because of conflicts with his father. Hou surprised Emperor Liang by besieging the Liang capital at Jiankang. Attempts by Liang forces to break the siege failed, and Emperor Wu was forced to negotiate a ceasefire and peace. However, Hou thought that peace was unsustainable, so he broke the ceasefire and captured the palace, leading to the slaughter of the nearby populace. Emperor Wu was starved to death and after the short puppet reigns of crown prince Xiao Gang and Xiao Dong, Hou seized power and established the Han dynasty.

In spite of conquering Jiankang, Hou essentially only controlled the nearby areas. The rest of the Liang dynasty lands were under the control of members of the imperial clan. Their squabbling amongst themselves weakened their efforts to defeat Hou. In the end, Xiao Yi with the aid of his generals Wang Sengbian and Chen Baxian defeated Hou, crowning himself Emperor Yuan of Liang. His brother Xiao Ji based in Sichuan was still a major threat. Emperor Yuan asked for assistance from Western Wei to defeat Xiao Ji, but after subduing Xiao Ji, they kept Sichuan. Due to a diplomatic faux pas, he incited the anger of Yuwen Tai, the leading general of Western Wei, which resulted in him being deposed and dying. Western Wei set up the puppet state of Western Liang with capital at Jiangling. Northern Qi also had designs on the Liang throne and sent an expedition under the banner of a cousin of Emperor Yuan. Chen Baxian and Wang Sengbian set up the last surviving son of Emperor Yuan, Xiao Fangzhi, as Liang ruler, but he was not given the imperial title. After some defeats to the forces of Northern Qi, Wang Sengbian allowed their pretender, Xiao Yuanming to establish himself as Emperor Min of Liang. However, Chen Baxian was displeased with the arrangements, and in a surprise move killed Wang and deposed Emperor Min in favor of Xiao Fangzhi who became Emperor Jing of Liang. After a short reign, Chen deposed Emperor Jing and took power himself as Emperor Wu of Chen in 557.

Chen (557–589)

Emperor Wu of Chen came from the region of Wu (a region near modern-day Shanghai). At that time, due to the Hou Jing rebellion, the Qiao and Wu clans were greatly weakened, and many independent regimes emerged. Emperor Wu could not pacify all the independent regimes, so he adopted conciliatory measures. After the sudden death of Emperor Wu, his nephew Chen Qian took power as Emperor Wen of Chen. After the fall of Liang, the general Wang Lin had established an independent kingdom based in modern-day Hunan and Hubei provinces and was now starting to cause trouble. Wang Lin allied with Northern Zhou and Northern Qi to conquer the Chen capital at Jiankang. Emperor Wen first defeated the combined forces of Northern Qi and Wang Lin before preventing the forces of Northern Zhou from entering the South at Yueyang. Furthermore, through Emperor Wen's extensive efforts at good governance, the economic situation of the South was greatly improved, restoring his kingdom's national strength.

Following the death of Emperor Wen, his son, the weak-willed Chen Bozong, took power and became Emperor Fei of Chen. His uncle, Chen Xu, after essentially controlling the country through his short reign, eventually deposed him and took power as Emperor Xuan of Chen. At that time, the Northern Zhou intended to conquer Northern Qi and thus invited the Chen dynasty to help. Emperor Xuan agreed to help because he wanted to recover the lost territories south of the Huai River. In 573, he sent general Wu Mingche to assist the effort; in two years, he managed to recover he lost territories south of the Huai River. At the time, Northern Qi was in a precarious situation with little military strength and Emperor Xuan could have taken advantage of the opportunity to entirely defeat Northern Qi. However, he only wanted to protect his territories south of the Huai River. Northern Zhou instead took advantage of Northern Qi's weakness and following their defeat of Northern Qi, in 577, they sent troops to the territories south of the Huai River, where they decisively defeated the Chen dynasty forces. The Chen dynasty was in imminent danger.

In a stroke of fortune, Northern Zhou's Emperor Wu suddenly died and his general Yang Jian attempted to take the throne. This stopped the southern advance of the northern troops. The respite was short though, as after Yang Jian defeated his rival General Yuchi Jiong, he usurped the throne from Emperor Jing of Northern Zhou and established the Sui dynasty, crowning himself Emperor Wen of Sui. He proceeded to invade the south to reunify China. Emperor Xuan had just died and his incompetent son Chen Shubao (Houzhu of Chen) took power. He was licentious and wasteful, resulting in chaos and corruption in the government; many officials heavily exploited the people, causing great suffering. In planning to defeat the Chen dynasty, Emperor Wen of Sui took the suggestion of his general Gao Jiong and waited until the South were harvesting their crops to entirely burn the farmland, crippling the strength of the Chen dynasty. In 588, Emperor Wen of Sui sent his son Yang Guang (who would become Emperor Yang of Sui) to finally vanquish the Chen dynasty. Chen Shubao relied on the natural barrier of the Yangtze River and continued as always with his festive and licentious activities. The next year, Sui forces captured the Chen capital of Jiankang. Chen Shubao and his favorite concubine Zhang Lihua attempted to hide in a well but eventually were captured by Sui forces, thus ending the Chen dynasty.

Diplomacy
After the failure of the Liu Song's efforts to form an alliance with the Rouran, Goguryeo, Tuyuhun and smaller local powers to defeat the Northern Wei, the North and South were forced into tacitly acknowledging their equal status, for example, by granting each other the highest positions as the most esteemed envoys. As the Wei Shu and Song Shu testify, there was a shift from imperial rhetoric denouncing the other side as illegitimate barbarians, towards a new conception referring to the two as distinct 'Northern' and Southern' parallels, using unique local customs to distinguish themselves and compete for legitimacy.

Demographics
It was during the Northern and Southern dynasties period that the earliest recorded mass migration of ethnic Han to southern China (south of the Yangtze River) took place. This sinicisation helped to develop the region from its previous state of being inhabited by isolated communities separated by vast uncolonized wilderness and other non-Han ethnic groups. During this period, the south went from being nearly a frontier to being on a path to the thriving, urbanized, sinicized region that it became in later centuries. In his book Buddhism in Chinese History, Arthur F. Wright points out this fact by stating:

"When we speak of the area of the Yangtze valley and below in the period of disunion, we must banish from our minds the picture of the densely populated, intensively cultivated South China of recent centuries. When the aristocrats of the remnants of the Chin [Jin] ruling house fled to the Nanking [Nanjing] area early in the 4th century, the south contained perhaps a tenth of the population of China. There were centers of Chinese culture and administration, but around most of these lay vast uncolonized areas into which Chinese settlers were slow to move".

During the Northern and Southern dynasties, the Yangtze valley transformed from a backwater frontier region with less than 25% of China's population to a major cultural center of China with 40% of China's population, and after China was subsequently unified under the Tang dynasty, they became the core area of Chinese culture.

Culture

Language
When the Jin court fled south they continued to speak in the refined common language, tongyu, from the Central Plains in the North, which was regarded as highly prestigious. However, many local southern Chinese resisted adopting the speech of the newcomers. During the Southern dynasties period, beginning in the mid-4th century and spreading widely by the 5th century, elite northern emigres and southern locals around the capital of Jiankang developed a new elite speech form, with clearly distinctive pronunciation and phrasing that set it apart from the Central Plains speech. However, some of the emigres also resisted this new trend to "prize the speech of Wu" (重吳聲), which they regarded as "seductive and frivolous". Meanwhile, the process of Han Chinese  courtiers learning Xianbei and Xianbei learning Chinese led to the court speech of the North changing as well. By the 6th century, southern elites looked down on the accent of Luoyang as "crude and clumsy".

Philosophy

Confucianism's unchallenged domination of Chinese culture and thought was greatly weakened during the Jin dynasty, which led to a wide diversification of political thought and philosophy by the time of the Northern and Southern dynasties.  This era produced a myriad of writers that advocated practical systems of governance and administration, such as Cao Cao and Zhuge Liang in the Three Kingdoms Period, Wang Dao and Bao Jingyan of the Eastern Jin, as well as Fan Zhen, Xing Shao, and Fan Xun of the Northern and Southern period.  Much of the philosophy of the period is despondent and dispirited, and a number of scholars and poets became reclusive mountain hermits living apart from society.  Of these various trends, the most influential was Neo-Daoism.  Neo-Daoism was highly influential during the Southern Dynasty, to the point that Emperor Wen of Liu Song established a Neo-Daoist Academy and promoted it, along with Confucianism, literature, and history, as the four great subjects of study.  A phenomenon known as "empty chat" became common, where educated men would meet and talk about philosophy all day without paying any attention to "mundane" things such as their profession or family.  The phenomenon gradually waned during the Sui dynasty, though it did not fully disappear until the Tang dynasty.

Literature

Literature was particularly vibrant during the Southern Dynasty and tended to be flowery and frilly, while Northern Dynasty literature was rougher and more straightforward.  Notable writers include Yu Xin, Xing Fang, Wei Shou, and Wen Zisheng of the Northern Dynasty.  In poetry, fu poetry continued to be a dominant genre, though the five-syllable form that achieved great prominence during the Tang dynasty gradually increased in popularity. In the Southern Dynasty, a type of essay known as pian wen, which used metered rhyme, flowery language, and classical allusions, became popular.  Writings often spoke of removing oneself from everyday material existence and jettisoning cares and anxiety.

Poets of the Northern and Southern dynasties focused on imitating older classical poets of Ancient China, formalizing the rhyme patterns and meters that governed poem composition.  However, scholars realized that ancient songs and poems, like those of the Shijing, in many instances no longer rhymed due to sound shifts over the previous centuries.
The introduction of Buddhism to China, which began in the late Han dynasty and continued through the Tang dynasty, introduced Chinese scholars to Sanskrit. The Brahmi script, with its sophisticated phonological organization, arrived in China in the 5th century, and was studied by Xie Lingyun, who produced a (since-lost) glossary of Chinese transcriptions of Sanskrit terms "arranged according to the 14 sounds".
The four tones of early Middle Chinese were first described by Shen Yue and Zhou Yong.

Other arts

The southern dynasties of China were rich in cultural achievement, with the flourishing of Buddhism and Daoism, especially the latter as two new canons of scriptural writings were created for the Supreme Purity sect and its rival the Numinous Treasure Sect. The southern Chinese were influenced greatly by the writings of Buddhist monks such as Huiyuan, who applied familiar Daoist terms to describe Buddhism for other Chinese. The Chinese were in contact and influenced by cultures of India and trading partners farther south, such as the kingdoms of Funan and Champa (located in modern-day Cambodia and Vietnam).

The sophistication and complexity of the Chinese arts of poetry, calligraphy, painting, and playing of music reached new heights during this age. The earlier Cao Zhi, son of Cao Cao, is regarded as one of the greatest poets of his day. His style and deep emotional expression in writing influenced later poets of this new age, such as Tao Qian (365–427) or Tao Yuanming. Even during his lifetime, the written calligraphy of the "Sage of Calligraphy", Wang Xizhi (307–365), was prized by many and considered a true form of personal expression like other arts. Painting became highly prized with artists such as Gu Kaizhi (344–406), who largely established the tradition of landscape art in classical Chinese painting (to learn more, refer to the "Far East" section of the article for Painting).

Institutions of learning in the south were also renowned, including the Zongmingguan (Imperial Nanjing University), where the famed Zu Chongzhi (mentioned above) had studied. Zu Chongzhi devised the new Daming Calendar in 465, calculated one year as 365.24281481 days (which is very close to 365.24219878 days as we know today), and calculated the number of overlaps between sun and moon as 27.21223 (which is very close to 27.21222 as we know today). Using this number he successfully predicted 4 eclipses during a period of 23 years (from 436 to 459).

Although multiple-story towers such as guard towers and residential apartments existed in previous periods, during this period the distinct Chinese pagoda tower (for storing Buddhist scriptures) evolved from the stupa, the latter originating from Buddhist traditions of protecting sutras in ancient India.

Maps

See also 
 Military history of the Northern and Southern dynasties
 Timeline of the Northern and Southern dynasties
 Northern and southern China
 Chinese sovereign
 List of tributaries of Imperial China
 Buddhism in China
 Empress Dowager Hu (Northern Wei)
 Yan Zhitui
 Jinping Commandery

Notes

References

Further reading 
 
 
 
 
 
 Miller, Roy Andrew (1959): Accounts of Western Nations in the History of the Northern Chou Dynasty. University of California Press.
 Wright, Arthur F. (1959). Buddhism in Chinese History. Stanford: Stanford University Press.

External links 

 Period of the Northern and Southern Dynasties
 Early Imperial China:  A Working Collection of Resources  

 
States and territories established in the 420s
States and territories disestablished in the 580s
Dynasties in Chinese history
Former countries in Chinese history
.
.
Medieval Asia
420 establishments
5th-century establishments in China
589 disestablishments
6th-century disestablishments in China